New Sukth Stadium is a multi-use stadium in Sukth, Durrës, Albania. The stadium has a seated capacity of 1,000 spectators and is the current home of FK Sukthi

For some years, the stadium consisted of basic parkland. An initiative from the local municipal and football players brought the stadium up to modern standards.

References

FK Sukthi
Football venues in Albania
Multi-purpose stadiums
Sport in Durrës
Buildings and structures in Durrës